Above Average Productions is an online comedy distributor and multi-channel network owned by Broadway Video. As of February 1, 2016 the network has over 8.6 million subscribers and 2.4 billion views on YouTube.

History and formation

Above Average

Above Average Productions is the digital sector of Lorne Michaels' production company, Broadway Video. Michaels previously formed Above Average Productions during the late 1970s when a series of specials were developed under a production company of the same name. However, the online comedy network that it is known as today was not founded until 2012.

In June 2012, Above Average Productions quietly launched after Broadway Video decided to help produce a Web series that Saturday Night Live writer Mike O'Brien had come up with. The series was called 7 Minutes in Heaven and featured Mike O'Brien interviewing celebrities such as Patricia Arquette and Ellen DeGeneres, among others, in a small closet. After production on the series commenced, other members of the Broadway Video family expressed their desire to contribute to the online comedy community. This eagerness from within the company, along with popularity of 7 Minutes in Heaven, prompted Broadway Video to make the decision to officially revive the Above Average brand and form the "boutique multi-channel network" that Above Average is today. The current president of Above Average is Jennifer Danielson.

In 2018, Above Average Productions along with NBC created a show for Snapchat called How Low Will You Go.

Above Average Productions is based out of New York City.

The Kicker

In October 2015, Above Average partnered with SNL co-head writer Bryan Tucker to launch a new sports comedy brand, The Kicker. The Kicker creates original sports comedy videos, articles, images, and digital content that are similar in tone to that of Above Average.

The Kicker distributes its content on its website as well as on its official YouTube channel.

Content

Above Average Productions creates comedy shorts for mostly online audiences. The style of comedy is typically highbrow and satirical; goofier, lowbrow content is also released occasionally. The company's focus, however isn't only on producing quality content. Above Average gives up-and-coming comedians an opportunity to show off their talents, grow as performers, and to expand their professional networks. Comedians such as Broad City's Ilana Glazer and SNL's Sasheer Zamata were both featured on Above Average before moving onto larger scale television projects. Above Average also collaborates greatly within their many channels, as well as with other branches of Broadway Video, whether it be through sharing actors, writers, or directors.

Above Average has also ventured into media other than YouTube, such as Hulu, Yahoo, and international distributors, although YouTube continues to be the production company's main marketing tool. Above Average has also ventured offline in the past, creating an animated pilot for Comedy Central entitled Waco Valley, based on the network's popular web-series about a dinosaur reporter, although the focus of the group remains on creating quality web content. Above Average has also done advertising work in the past, for companies such as Lexus, Oreos, and Mastercard,

Some of Above Average's channel partners include The Lonely Island, Jay Pharoah, Mike O'Brien of 7 Minutes in Heaven, POYKPAC, Melissa Hunter (creator of Adult Wednesday Addams), Dave and Ethan, Harvard Sailing Team, among others.

Above Average is home to 77 original series, such as 7 Minutes in Heaven, Alec Baldwin's Love Ride, Cool Kids' Table, Forgotten Assholes of History, Hudson Valley Ballers, I Wanna Have Your Baby, Is This Okay?, Paulilu Mixtape, Sound Advice, The Idiot's Guide to Smart People, Thingstarter, and Waco Valley.

Television appearances
 The Paul Simon Special (TV Special) (1979)
 Bob & Ray, Jane, Laraine & Gilda (TV Movie) (1979)
 80 Blocks from Tiffany's (1979)
 Neil Young in Berlin (Video) (1983)
 The Best of John Belushi (Video) (1985)
 The Chronic Rift: Jules Verne & H.G. Wells (1990–)
 The Rutles 2: Can't Buy Me Lunch (TV Movie) (2004)
 As the Fire Pit Burns (2016)

Notes

References

External links
Official website
YouTube channel
The Kicker
The Kicker YouTube channel
Above Average Productions Inc. (Sorted by Popularity Ascending)

Companies based in New York City
Multi-channel networks
American comedy websites
2012 establishments in New York City